This is a list of Louisiana–Monroe Warhawks football players in the NFL Draft.

Key

Selections

References

Louisiana-Monroe

Louisiana–Monroe Warhawks NFL Draft